Ummidia Quadratilla, was a wealthy Roman woman and was a member of the gens Ummidia. She died in the reign of Emperor Trajan (98-117) within a little of eighty years of age, leaving two-thirds (ex besse) of her fortune to her grandson and the other third to her granddaughter. Her grandson Ummidius Quadratus was an intimate friend of Roman Senator and historian Pliny the Younger, who praises her for fostering Quadratus' studies while keeping him untouched by her own luxurious lifestyle.

Pliny also mentioned she kept Quadratus untouched by her extravagant lifestyle "not only out of love, but also out of respect". She did this as in her youth this luxurious lifestyle was common for her and similar families. However, under the new Roman empire, society had become stricter and it was best for Quadratus to not indulge in these luxuries if he is to pursue his career.

Quadratilla was probably a daughter of Gaius Ummidius Durmius Quadratus, the governor of Syria, who died in 60AD. She is mentioned in two inscriptions discovered at Casinum in Lazio, the hometown of her family:
 "Ummidia C(ai) f(ilia) / Quadratilla / amphitheatrum et / templum Casinatibus / sua pecunia fecit".
 "[Ummidia C(ai) f(ilia) Qu]adrati[lla theatr]um / [impensis? patri]s sui [exornatum? vetus]tate / [collapsum Casinatibus su]a pec(unia) [res]titu[it et ob dedica]tionem / [decurionibus et popu]lo et [m]ulier[ibus epulum] dedit" (/)

Bibliography

References

External links
 Pliny Ep. vii. 24 (English)
 Pliny Ep. Book vii (Latin)

1st-century Roman women
2nd-century Romans
Quadratilla